Marlon Krause (born 1 September 1990) is a German former professional footballer who plays as a centre-back.

External links 
 
 
 

1990 births
Living people
German footballers
Association football central defenders
FC St. Pauli players
FC Carl Zeiss Jena players
Holstein Kiel players
SG Sonnenhof Großaspach players
1. FC Saarbrücken players
3. Liga players
Regionalliga players